The J.W. Jung Seed Company is a family-owned and operated garden seed company founded in 1907 in Randolph, Wisconsin by John William "J.W." Jung. The company publishes several seed catalogs including Jung Seed, Totally Tomatoes, Vermont Bean Seed Company, Edmunds Roses, Roots & Rhizomes, R. H. Shumway, McClure & Zimmerman and HPS Seed. The company also runs several retail garden centers in Wisconsin.

Jung Seed Genetics was spun off in the 1990s. Jung Seed Genetics and Jung Seed Company are not the same company and not affiliated.

References

External links
 

Agriculture companies of the United States
Companies established in 1907
Seed companies
Companies based in Wisconsin
1907 establishments in Wisconsin
Family-owned companies of the United States